The Centre For Macroeconomics (CFM) is a research centre in London dedicated to the investigation and development of new methodologies and research in order to inform economic policy decisions. It also focuses on ways to alleviate the effects of the global economic crisis through its careful study. The CFM is funded by the Economic and Social Research Council (ESRC), and was founded in 2012. It is one of the larger research centers in the world dedicated to the study of financial crises.

Research Programmes 

Chaired by LSE’s Christopher Pissarides, the Centre comprises economists from University of Cambridge, London School of Economics (LSE), University of Oxford, University College London (UCL), the Bank of England and the National Institute of Economic and Social Research (NIESR).
The Centre is co-directed by Ricardo Reis, Professor of Economics at LSE.

The Centre's main research activities are divided into five different areas:
 Developing new methodologies
 Consequences of fiscal austerity plans and high debt levels
 Interaction between financial markets, monetary policy, and the macro economy
 Shifts in the world economy
 Labour markets, unemployment levels and long term prospects

Research is disseminated through events, workshops, seminars and published materials – in particular, through a discussion paper series on  RePEc, and a public lecture programme at LSE.

CFM Survey 

Launched in 2014, the monthly CFM Survey questions a panel of UK-based economists on macroeconomic and public policy in both the UK and international economies, and highlights the degree of consensus among these experts. The survey aims to give a comprehensive overview of the beliefs held by economists, in particular "to include the views of those economists whose opinions are not frequently heard in public debates".

References

External links 
 Official Website
 CFM Survey

Economic research institutes